Beta Upsilon Chi is the largest Christian fraternity in the United States. The Fraternity is currently composed of 29 active chapters and 6 active colonies in 16 states. The chapters include:

References

External links 
Beta Upsilon Chi national website

Beta Upsilon Chi
chapters